The Men's 51 kg event at the 2010 South American Games had its quarterfinals held on March 23, the semifinals on March 25 and the final on March 27.

Medalists

Results

Main Bracket

References
Report

51kg M